HNLMS Gelderland was a  protected cruiser of the Royal Netherlands Navy. During its career in the Dutch Navy it was most notable for being the ship Queen Wilhelmina sent to Portuguese East Africa to transport Paul Kruger to Europe during the Second Boer War. The ship was taken over by the Germans during World War II, rebuilt as an anti-aircraft cruiser and renamed Niobe. Commissioned into the German navy on 1 March 1944, she was sunk in Kotka harbour in Finland on 16 July 1944.

Service history
The ship was built at the Maatschappij voor Scheeps- en Werktuigbouw Fijenoord in Rotterdam and launched on 28 September 1898. 
The ship was commissioned on 15 July 1900. On 22 November that year she arrived in Marseille with Paul Kruger who she had picked up in Lourenço Marques by order of the Dutch Government. After dropping Kruger off she left for the Dutch East Indies. During this trip while entering the harbor of Port Said she collided with the British steamer Peterson. The collision required the ship to be repaired at Suez. On 6 January 1901 she could resume her journey and arrived three days later on 9 January in Surabaya.

On 6 July 1904 Gelderland and  both ran aground near Aroes Lampoejang, South Sumatra because of incomplete maps. The ships were repaired in Surabaya and Singapore respectively.

On 17 June 1905 Gelderland and her sisters  and Utrecht returned to the Netherlands. The journey involved stops in Tanjung Priok, Mahé, Perim, Port Said, Algiers and Tangier arriving at Den Helder  on 30 August that year.

On 17 June 1911 Gelderland left Rotterdam for England. On board was Prince Henry of the Netherlands who traveled to the United Kingdom to attend the coronation of George V. For the last part of the journey Gelderland  was escorted by four British torpedo boats.

Gelderland was sent to Constantinople on 11 November 1912 because of rising political tension and a direct war threat. A landing party of 100 men was put ashore and took position in the legations section of the city on 18 November 1912.

While patrolling along the Dutch coast an explosion occurred on 14 March 1917, killing one man and severely wounding nine others. After returning to port the ship was taken out of service for maintenance.

After World War I she served as an artillery training ship in the Dutch navy.

World War II
The ship was seized by the Germans during their invasion of the Netherlands in 1940, and remained laid up at Den Helder from 14 May 1940 until August 1941, when she was taken in hand at the Van der Giessen de Noord shipyard at Krimpen aan den IJssel to be rebuilt as an anti-aircraft cruiser ("Flakschiff"). Work was completed in December 1943, and Gelderland commissioned in the German Kriegsmarine under the new name of Niobe on  1 March 1944.  

During the Vyborg–Petrozavodsk Offensive of 1944 the Soviets tried to finish the Continuation War with the Finns. The Germans came to the aid of the Finns, and, among the materiel brought with them was the anti-aircraft cruiser Niobe, which was ordered to strengthen the air defences of Kotka, then one of the most bombed cities in Finland. At the same time, the Soviet Union had put much emphasis on finding and sinking the Finnish coastal defence ship . Soviet aerial reconnaissance identified a large ship in Kotka harbour and the decision was taken to attack, with 132 bombers and fighters (sent by, amongst others, the 51st Mine-Torpedo Aviation Regiment of the Red Banner Baltic Fleet), on 16 July 1944. The ship was, however, Niobe, and the aircraft were met with fierce resistance. An A-20 Havoc bomber was shot down, but the ship was hit and sank. The guns of the Niobe were still firing as she settled in the shallow water, after which much of her superstructure remained visible above sea level. Seventy of the crew of the Niobe died.

Niobe was raised in June 1953 and scrapped.

References

Bibliography

External links

Niobe sinking (in Russian)
Gelderland page
Niobe
Pictures and facts
 02. Feb 2018, Maarjamäe väljakaevamistel selgus maetud meremeeste saladus, err.ee

Holland-class cruisers
1898 ships
Maritime incidents in July 1944
Cruisers sunk by aircraft
Naval ships of the Netherlands captured by Germany during World War II
World War II shipwrecks in the Baltic Sea
Shipwrecks of Finland
Ships sunk by Soviet aircraft